Pizzorno is an Italian surname. Notable people with the surname include:

Alessandro Pizzorno (1924–2019), Italian sociologist, political scientist and philosopher
Ángelo Pizzorno (born 1992), Uruguayan footballer
Serge Pizzorno (born 1980), British guitarist, vocalist, music producer and songwriter
Tullio Pizzorno (1921–?), Italian sailor

See also
Bianca Pitzorno (born 1942), Italian children's writer